Cortex or cortical may refer to:

Biology
 Cortex (anatomy), the outermost layer of an organ
 Cerebral cortex, the outer layer of the vertebrate cerebrum, part of which is the forebrain
 Motor cortex, the regions of the cerebral cortex involved in voluntary motor functions
 Prefrontal cortex, the anterior part of the frontal lobes of the brain
 Visual cortex, regions of the cerebral cortex involved in visual functions
 Cerebellar cortex, the outer layer of the vertebrate cerebellum
 Renal cortex, the outer portion of the kidney
 Adrenal cortex, a portion of the adrenal gland
 Cell cortex, the region of a cell directly underneath the membrane
 Cortex (hair), the middle layer of a strand of hair
 Cortex (botany), the outer portion of the stem or root of a plant

Entertainment
 Cortex (film), a 2008 French film directed by Nicolas Boukhrief

 Cortex (podcast), a 2015 podcast
 Cortex Command, a 2012 video game
 Doctor Neo Cortex, a fictional character in the Crash Bandicoot video game series
 Nina Cortex, the niece of Neo Cortex
 Cortex, a French jazz funk band featuring Alain Mion
 Cortex, a Swedish post-punk alternative band featuring Freddie Wadling

Other uses
 Cortex (archaeology), the outer layer of rock formed on the exterior of raw materials by chemical and mechanical weathering processes
 Cortex (journal), cognitive science journal published by Elsevier
 Cortex, a family of the ARM architecture of CPUs
 Cortex, a division of Gemini Sound Products
 Cortex, a digital lending platform by Think Finance
 Cortex Pharmaceuticals, a company of New Jersey, United States
 Cortex Innovation Community, a district in St. Louis, Missouri, United States

See also
 
 
 Cordtex, a type of detonating cord used in mining
 Corex (disambiguation)